Route 1A, largely signed as Scenic 1A, is a  long numbered state highway located in Washington County, Rhode Island, United States. The route, which parallels U.S. Route 1 (US 1) for its entire length, has four distinct sections connected by US 1, two of which require median u-turn ramps to cross US 1. It travels through five towns in Washington County: Westerly, Charlestown, South Kingstown, Narragansett, and North Kingstown.

Route 1A should not be confused with U.S. Route 1A, which exists north of Route 1A in Providence County, beginning in Warwick and crossing into Massachusetts in Pawtucket, Rhode Island. Not helping matters is the presence of Route 1A shields on US 1A.

Route description

Route 1A follows U.S. Route 1 (US 1) closely through Washington County. US 1 is a divided highway for most of its length in this region; there is also a short freeway section in South Kingstown and Narragansett. Because Interstate 95 largely bypasses the main population centers in the southern portion of the state, instead following a more inland routing, US 1 serves as the main thoroughfare. Route 1A, in comparison, runs on surface streets, acting as an alternate route for US 1 that provides access to more local roads and business districts. There are four distinct sections, each separated segments of US 1.

Westerly section
Beginning in downtown Westerly, the roadway takes a more southerly route for its first  in the town, serving the affluent coastal community of Watch Hill and Misquamicut State Beach. The roadway begins as Main Street, which diverges from US 1 (Broad Street) just after the latter route crosses the Pawcatuck River from Stonington, Connecticut. Route 1A north continues southward on Beach Street before turning south onto Watch Hill Road. The roadway then turns to the southeast along Shore Road, which runs parallel to Misquamicut Beach, Atlantic Beach and Winnapaug Pond, until Shore Road meets Post Road not far from the Charlestown town line.

Charlestown and South Kingstown sections
The roadway follows Old Post Road in Charlestown past Ninigret National Wildlife Refuge before merging back with the northbound lanes of US 1 / Post Road.

This section follows Old Post Road through Charlestown village and into South Kingstown before re-merging with US 1. This segment serves as a beach bypass, providing access to Charlestown Breachway State Beach, Charlestown Town Beach and Green Hill Beach. This segment also provides access to Route 110, before terminating at US 1 again, this time at the southbound lanes.

South Kingstown to North Kingstown section

This section, like the previous one, is split into two by way of a closed median interchange. It parallels US 1 as a former alignment of the Boston Post Road before reaching the closed interchange.

Route 1A runs north and east along Post Road and Main Street into the village of Wakefield, a major commercial center of South Kingstown. Just after exiting downtown Wakefield, the road intersects with Route 108, beginning a  wrong-way concurrency: Route 1A north and Route 108 south run in a southeasterly direction along Kingstown Road. After entering the town of Narragansett, the concurrent routes partially intersect US 1 at a grade-separated interchange. Just south of the US 1 overpass, Route 108 south and Route 1A north both enter the Dillon (Narragansett) Rotary. Route 108 exits to the south, heading towards the villages of Galilee and Point Judith, while Route 1A exits to the east, heading towards the village of Narragansett Pier.

The  portion of Route 1A in Wakefield between US 1 and the Dillon Rotary is not actually signed as part of Route 1A on most maps; however, the Rhode Island Department of Transportation (RIDOT) has posted reassurance markers on Post Road, Main Street and Kingstown Road though Wakefield, and the register of state highways indicates that this routing is officially part of Route 1A.

In Narragansett, Route 1A follows Kingstown Road and Narragansett Avenue. When the highway reaches the village of Narragansett Pier, it turns due north onto Beach Street and passes Narragansett Town Beach just north of The Towers. The mainline of Beach Street becomes Boston Neck Road just north of the village center and crosses the Pettaquamscutt River (also known as Narrow River) via the Sprague Bridge. Route 1A serves as a major commercial corridor in northern Narragansett, and also provides access to the village of Bonnet Shores. It then crosses into the Saunderstown neighborhood of North Kingstown, interchanging with Rhode Island Route 138 just west of the Jamestown-Verrazano Bridge. Route 1A heads north for another  before crossing a branch of Wickford Cove via the Hussey Bridge, entering the village of Wickford. Route 1A turns north onto Brown Street, intersecting with the southern terminus of Route 102. The roadway then turns to the west onto West Main Street before terminating at US 1 just northwest of the main Wickford business district.

History
At various points in time, every segment of Route 1A except the one in Westerly served as part of U.S. 1, which historically was the lower routing of the Boston Post Road mail route. The Route 1A designation came after the U.S. 1 designation was moved to a different alignment. This led to most segments of Route 1A being named Old Post Road or Post Road, while much of US 1 is now named the Commodore Perry Highway.

Before that, Route 1A existed on an alignment that is now roughly Route 3.

The  segment from old U.S. 1 in downtown Wakefield to current US 1 near Wickford, now most of the fourth section, was once Route 1B. It was renumbered to Route 1A by 1934.

Major intersections

References

External links

2019 Highway Map, Rhode Island

001A
A Rhode Island
Transportation in Washington County, Rhode Island
Westerly, Rhode Island
Charlestown, Rhode Island
South Kingstown, Rhode Island
Narragansett, Rhode Island
North Kingstown, Rhode Island